Edifício Santos Dumont is an office skyscraper with a circular footprint located in the Centro neighbourhood of Rio de Janeiro, Brazil. The building, inaugurated in 1975, has a height of 141 meters and has 45 floors.

Skyscrapers in Rio de Janeiro (city)
Office buildings completed in 1975
Skyscraper office buildings in Brazil